Love Is a Pendulum is an album released by American jazz vibraphonist Joe Locke in 2015 on the Motéma label. The album is centered on the five-movement suite of the same name, which Locke was inspired to write after reading a poem by Barbara Sfraga.

Track listing

Personnel 
 Joe Locke – vibraphone, producer
 Robert Rodriguez – piano
 Ricky Rodriguez – double bass, bass guitar
 Terreon Gully – drums, producer

Guests
 Donny McCaslin – tenor saxophone
 Rosario Giuliani – alto saxophone, soprano saxophone
 Paul Bollenback – guitar
 Victor Provost – steel pan
 Theo Bleckmann – vocals

References 

Joe Locke albums
2015 albums